Diabetes is a monthly peer-reviewed medical journal published since 1952 by the American Diabetes Association. It covers research about the physiology and pathophysiology of diabetes mellitus including any aspect of laboratory, animal or human research. Emphasis is on investigative reports focusing on areas such as the pathogenesis of diabetes and its complications, normal and pathologic pancreatic islet function and intermediary metabolism, pharmacological mechanisms of drug and hormone action, and biochemical and molecular aspects of normal and abnormal biological processes.  Diabetes also publishes abstracts presented at the ADA's annual meeting, Scientific Sessions, as a supplement.

According to the Journal Citation Reports, the journal has a 2021 impact factor of 9.337, and 5 years impact factor of 10.509 ranking it 8th out of 240 journals in the category "Endocrinology, Diabetes & Metabolism".

See also 
 American Diabetes Association
 Diabetes Care

References

External links 
 

Publications established in 1952
Endocrinology journals
English-language journals
Diabetes
Monthly journals
Academic journals published by learned and professional societies